Hammartun Lower Secondary School is a public lower secondary school situated in Lillehammer, Norway. The school educates around 489 students aged 13–16.

The school started teaching in 1841. The buildings it occupies today were built in 1846 and later added to.

It is situated very close to the center of Lillehammer, approximately 40 meters from the train station.

References

External links
 Official site

Education in Innlandet
Secondary schools in Norway
Educational institutions established in 1841